Alkistis Protopsalti, born as Alkistis Sevasti Attikuzel, is a Greek singer .

Life 
Alkistis Protopsalti was born in Alexandria, Egypt to Greek parents. At the age of six, Alkistis moved  to Athens because of the political events that were taking place back then in Egypt.

In 2015, she served as the Alternate Minister for Tourism in the Caretaker Cabinet of Vassiliki Thanou-Christophilou.

Discography

Studio albums

Alkistis has released 16 studio albums. Her best selling album to date is the 1997 album "San Ifestio Pou Xipna" which sold more than 100,000 copies.

Singles

References

1954 births
Living people
21st-century Greek women singers
People from Alexandria
Egyptian people of Greek descent
20th-century Greek women singers
Singers from Athens